Counterparts is a 2007 German drama film directed by Jan Bonny.

Cast 
 Matthias Brandt - Georg Hoffmann
 Victoria Trauttmansdorff - Anne Hoffmann
 Wotan Wilke Möhring - Michael Gleiwitz
 Susanne Bormann - Denise
 Anna Brass - Marie Hoffmann
  - Lukas Hoffmann
  - Hans Josef
  - Mechthild
  - Andreas Hinreich
 Ole Ohlson - Robert
 Özgür Özata - Ahmet Celik
  - Sabrina
 Till Butterbach - Polizei-Kollege
  - Arzt

References

External links 

2007 drama films
2007 films
German drama films
2000s German films